Alberto Rojas Jiménez (July 21, 1900 – May 25, 1934) was a Chilean poet and journalist born in Valparaiso to Alberto Rojas Guajardo and Elena Jiménez Labarca. A student of the National Internship Barros Arana, Jiménez studied at the School of Architecture and Fine Arts at the University of Chile. His literary output, which is defined primarily as a poet and writer, began in 1918 with the publication of works in prose in the magazine Zig-Zag under the pseudonym Pierre Lhéry, and ended with his writings published in the newspaper El Correo de Valdivia. Jiménez was part of the Chilean Literary Generation of the 1920 era that included Joaquín Cifuentes Sepúlveda, Armando Ulloa, Alejandro Vasquez, Rubén Azócar, Raimundo Echevarría Larrazabal, and Pablo Neruda.

Jiménez was a virtuoso draftsman influenced by Marc Chagall's body of work. His drawings influenced the aesthetic style of and contributed to the spread of painters and sculptors while he directed and collaborated with them for the newspaper Clarity (whose directors in its initial period were Raúl Silva Castro and Rafael Yepez). Jiménez also wrote for numerous national magazines and newspapers. In the Journal of Education, he contributed as an art critic and made contributions as a poet and articles in which he expressed his knowledge of the art of the time. He wrote in the journals Gaceta de Chile and Magazine of Art. Also, the daily La Nación had him as editor at "Montparnasse" page, where he collaborated on occasion with Luis Vargas Rosas and Juan Emar. In addition, in the daily La República de Valdivia, he was charged with the "Kaleidoscope" column.

In 1923 Jiménez traveled to Paris with his friend, the painter Abelardo Bustamante Paschin. There he, Paschin, and Magallanes Moure developed unusual trades, such as a cartoonist in bars and cafés or lender of a lens on the streets so that passersby could see the stars.

Jiménez wrote under the pseudonyms: Zain Gimel, Pierre Hugo Lhéry, and Ramiel.

In April 1930 he published the book Chileans in Paris, his only published work. The book chronicled his impressions of people and a season of experiences, covering the multitude of Chileans seen parading through the cities of Europe. Among the characters therein: Vicente Huidobro, Julio Ortiz de Zarate, Oscar Fabres, Abelardo Bustamante Paschin, and Rafael Silva.

The poet died in Santiago on May 25, 1934. Sixty years later, Oreste Plath and the National Library published an autobiographical account and collection of his work, entitled Alberto Rojas Jiménez Walked Around Dawn, which may be  downloaded in its original language.

Chilean poet, Pablo Neruda immortalized Alberto Rojas Jiménez in the poem " Alberto Rojas Jimenez comes flying". The poem would later be the inspiration for the form and content of Poet Laureate and Pulitzer Prize-winning poet, Elizabeth Bishop's poem set in Brooklyn, NY, entitled "An Invitation to Marianne Moore."

Works
Chileans in Paris. Chronicles. 1930
Charter - Ocean. Poetry. Posthumous publication.

References

Further reading
 The Investigations of Chilean Memory, National Library of Chile

1934 deaths
1900 births
Chilean journalists
Male journalists
Chilean male poets
20th-century Chilean poets
20th-century Chilean male writers
20th-century journalists